Bäckaby Old Church was a wooden church building in Sweden. The oldest pieces were dated back to the 1320s. The old wooden church was originally in Bäckaby outside Vetlanda before being purchased by a private person and moved to the town park in Jönköping where it was reopened on 31 August 1902. Back in Bäckaby, Bäckaby Old Church had been replaced by the newer Bäckaby Church in 1899.

In the evening of 28 April 2000, the church was completely destroyed by a fire, which soon appeared to be an act of arson. Local press brought major attention to the fire when it appeared to be connected to satanism and modern Paganism. Many people missed the church, which had been a popular place for weddings and baptism.

In 2003 a memorial site was opened.

See also
Kulla Chapel

References

External links

2000 fires in Europe
1320s establishments in Europe
14th-century churches in Sweden
Churches in Jönköping
Arson in Sweden
Demolished buildings and structures in Sweden
Churches destroyed by arson
Wooden churches in Sweden
Anti-Christian sentiment in Europe